Sigma Tau Gamma, commonly known as Sig Tau, is a United States college social fraternity founded on June 28, 1920, at the University of Central Missouri (then known as Central Missouri State Teachers College). The fraternity was founded as a result of friendships made while some of the founders fought in World War I in France.

The fraternity went on to create new chapters on the campuses surrounding teachers' colleges (at the time also called "normal schools"). Since the Fraternity's beginnings in 1920, they have since spread to more than 193 university campuses across the United States.

Sigma Tau Gamma Fraternity is an active member of the North American Interfraternity Conference.

History
Four of the founders (Emmett Ellis, Leland Thornton Hoback, Edward George Grannert, and William Glenn Parsons) had enlisted and served their country together during the First World War in France. Parsons commented that in founding the Fraternity they wanted to sustain a "sense of service, responsibility, and affection for their companions." These four, together with Allen Ross Nieman, Edward Henry McCune, Carl Nelson Chapman, Buell Wright McDaniel, George Eugene Hartrick, A. Barney Cott, Chiles Edward Hoffman, Rodney Edward Herndon, William Edward Billings, Clarence Willard Salter, Frank H. Gorman, Alpheus Oliphant Fisher, and Daniel Frank Fisher, were the 17 founders of the fraternity.

Several of the founders were members of the Irving Literary Society, but they wanted to create a new fraternity including members of other literary societies. On the morning of June 28, 1920, "at an unusually early hour" according to the original minutes, a list containing the names of about thirty men was posted on the college bulletin board by Emmett Ellis with a request to meet that afternoon.

According to the minutes, "the notice had the proper effect and, as requested, there appeared a goodly number of men to learn what was in store for them." Founder Nieman, who had become familiar with fraternities while attending William Jewell College, was the principal organizer of the meeting. He explained the purpose of the meeting and told them what such an organization could mean to the men of the college. The men elected Leland Hoback temporary Chairman and Emmett Ellis temporary Secretary. They agreed to begin crafting the organization and adjourned until July 7, 1920.

The founders were accompanied by Dr. Wilson C. Morris to present their petition to the faculty, who had been part of Sigma Nu in his college days. Dr. Morris became the Fraternity's first honorary member and served the alpha chapter at Central Missouri as patron, counselor, and advisor until his death in 1947.

A further fourteen members were added in the first year of the fraternity's existence. Founder Edward H. McCune recalled later that, "from the very beginning, Sigma Tau Gamma prospered, both in membership and service. Its challenge to students to live well and promote the spirit of brotherhood was continually being met by those who were seeking membership."

About

Membership
There are a number of public and private ceremonies and rituals in the fraternity, from initiation through to memorials for deceased fraternity members. Sigma Tau Gamma also has a development program known as the "Path of Principles". The first eight weeks of the program challenges associate members to "promote the highest ideals of brotherhood and demonstrate an abiding spirit in which all things in life are done and possible". Content is covered during weekly associate meetings held separate from the chapter meeting.

Awards and scholarships
The fraternity offers scholarships and awards to undergraduates and alumni during the summer convention. The individual awards include the Michael J. Steinbeck Fellowship, which offers assistance in the pursuit of graduate and professional degrees. Chapter awards include the Earl A. Webb Most Improved Chapter Award and the Emmett Ellis Chapter Scholarship Award.

Symbols
Mascot: Knight
Colors: Azure blue, white, red, and yellow
Coat of Arms: The coat of arms was adopted in 1927 and modified in 1954.
Badge: The badge, which all members may purchase and wear, is the principal symbol of membership. The badge was adopted in 1927 and modified in 2016. The standard gold badge is provided to each new member at the time of initiation.
Associate Pin: The pin is worn by associate members of the fraternity until initiation. The associate pin is the chapter's property and is returned to the chapter at the time of initiation by the new member.
White Rose: The white rose is the flower of Sigma Tau Gamma.

Events
The fraternity hosts multiple annual events, including:

The Noble Man Institute: a retreat-based leadership program for newly initiated members of Sigma Tau Gamma;
The Earl A. Webb academy: a three-day training and networking program for chapter presidents and vice presidents;
The Endeavor conference; and
The Grand Conclave.

Charity
On June 30, 2011, the Board of Directors announced its partnership with the Special Olympics in 2011, making it the fraternity’s official philanthropy. Each chapter is expected to provide service or funds directly to the Special Olympics.

Related corporations

Sigma Tau Gamma Foundation

Established in 1966, the Sigma Tau Gamma Foundation is its own distinct legal entity, considered a public charity (501c3) by the federal government and is separate from the Sigma Tau Gamma Fraternity. It makes use of tax-deductible charitable gift dollars for the development of chapters of the Sigma Tau Gamma fraternity. The Sigma Tau Gamma foundation started "Books for Kids" which raises money and books for public libraries and school districts.

WPN Housing Corporation 
Established in 2014, the WPN National Housing Company is a limited liability company established to provide housing assistance and management as it relates to the housing or other forms of shared fraternity living/meeting space for undergraduate members of Sigma Tau Gamma.

Notable alumni 

 Tommy Armstrong, former member of the Louisiana House of Representatives
 John Ashcroft, former US Senator of Missouri and former U.S. Attorney General
 Bill Bright, evangelist and founder of Campus Crusade for Christ
 Dee Brown, author of Bury My Heart At Wounded Knee
 Geoff Connor former Texas Secretary of State
 Brad Ellsworth, former US Congressman for Indiana
 Captain James A. Graham, Medal of Honor and Purple Heart recipient
 Mel Hancock, former US Congressman for Missouri
 James Kirkpatrick, former Missouri Secretary of State
 Andy Mayberry, former member of the Arkansas House of Representatives 
 Red Miller, former head coach of the Denver Broncos
 Gil Morgan, professional golfer
 Stan Musial, Major League Baseball Hall of Fame and Presidential Medal of Freedom recipient
 1st Lieutenant Carlos C. Ogden, Medal of Honor recipient
 Thomas Shaw, Episcopal priest of the fifteenth Bishop of Massachusetts
 George J. Trautman III, Lt. Gen., United States Marine Corps and deputy commandant for aviation
 Tim Seip, former member of the Pennsylvania House of Representatives 
 Jack Zduriencik, general manager of the Seattle Mariners
 Dennis Miller, comedian
Christian Sandberg - Caroline Kardemarks tämjare och allmänt king

See also
List of Sigma Tau Gamma chapters
List of social fraternities and sororities

Notes

Bibliography

Bernier, William P. "A Chain of Honor". Sigma Tau Gamma Fraternity, Inc., 2004
Dinsmore, Keith C. Teacher Immortal: The Enduring Influence of Wilson C. Morris. Warrensburg, Missouri: Sigma Tau Gamma Foundation, Inc., 1984.

External links
 Sigma Tau Gamma Website

 
Student organizations established in 1920
North American Interfraternity Conference
Student societies in the United States
Warrensburg, Missouri
1920 establishments in Missouri
Fraternities and sororities based in Indianapolis